Below is a partial list of minor league baseball players in the Detroit Tigers system.

Garrett Burhenn

Garrett Burhenn (born September 12, 1999) is an American professional baseball pitcher in the Detroit Tigers organization.

Burhenn grew up in Indianapolis, Indiana, and attended Lawrence North High School. He was named first team All-State as a senior.

Burhenn played college baseball for the Ohio State Buckeyes for three seasons. He was named to the Big Ten Conference All-Freshman team in his first season after posting a 6-4 record with a 3.96 ERA and 69 strikeouts. Burhenn went 2-2 with an 8.02 ERA and 29 strikeouts in  innings pitched over four starts during his sophomore season before it was cut short due to the coronavirus pandemic. As a junior, he went 7-2 with a 3.81 ERA and 91 strikeouts in  innings pitched and was named third team All-Big Ten.

Burhenn was selected in the ninth round of the 2021 Major League Baseball draft by the Detroit Tigers. He signed with the team on July 21, 2021, and received a $160,800 signing bonus. Burhenn was assigned to the Lakeland Flying Tigers of the Single-A Florida State League at the opening of the 2022 season.

 Ohio State Buckeyes bio

Dillon Dingler

Francis Dillon Dingler (born September 17, 1998) is an American professional baseball catcher in the Detroit Tigers organization.

Dingler attended Jackson High School in Massillon, Ohio, where he played baseball, basketball, and football, leading Jackson to state championships in both basketball and baseball his senior year. Undrafted in the 2017 Major League Baseball draft, he enrolled at Ohio State University where he played college baseball for the Ohio State Buckeyes.

As a freshman at Ohio State in 2018, Dingler batted .244 with four home runs and 17 RBIs over 53 games. He earned Big Ten Conference All-Freshman honors. In 2019, his sophomore year, he was named a team captain. He missed 19 games during the season due to a broken hamate bone in his left hand. Over 49 games, he slashed .291/.392/.424 with three home runs and 19 RBIs, and was named to the All-Big Ten second team. As a junior in 2019, Dingler once again was named a team captain. He hit .340 with five home runs and 14 RBIs over 13 games before the college baseball season was cut short due to the COVID-19 pandemic.

Dingler was selected by the Detroit Tigers in the second round with the 38th overall pick in the 2020 Major League Baseball draft. He signed for $1.93 million. He did not play a minor league game in 2020 due to the cancellation of the minor league season caused by the pandemic. To begin the 2021 season, he was assigned to the West Michigan Whitecaps of the High-A Central. After slashing .287/.376/.549 with eight home runs and 24 RBIs over 32 games, he was promoted to the Erie SeaWolves of the Double-A Northeast on June 13. In early August, he was placed on the injured list with a finger injury. He returned to play in early September. Over fifty games with Erie, Dingler batted .202/.264/.314 with four home runs and twenty RBIs. He returned to Erie for the 2022 season. He was selected to represent the Tigers at the 2022 All-Star Futures Game. Over 107 games with Erie, Dingler slashed .238/.333/.419 with 14 home runs, 58 RBIs, and 22 doubles. He was selected to play in the Arizona Fall League for the Salt River Rafters after the season.

Ohio State Buckeyes bio

Mason Englert

Mason Alexander Englert (born November 1, 1999) is an American professional baseball pitcher for the Detroit Tigers of Major League Baseball (MLB).

Englert attended Forney High School in Forney, Texas. In his senior season of 2018, Englert recorded 168 strikeouts over  innings. Englert broke a Texas high school baseball record by throwing  consecutive scoreless innings; a record previously held by David Clyde. Englert committed to Texas A&M University to play college baseball. Englert was drafted by the Texas Rangers in the 4th round, with the 119th overall selection, of the 2018 MLB draft. He signed with Texas for an over-slot $1 million signing bonus.

After signing, Englert did not appear in an official game with a Rangers affiliate in the 2018 season. Instead, he took part in a new program put in place by Texas for their newly drafted high school pitchers. The "de-load" program as the organization called it, emphasized building a foundation mentally and physically while resting the pitchers' bodies from a strenuous senior season and pre-draft showcase circuit. The players were put through a strength program and classroom work until the post-season fall instructional training started. Englert suffered a torn UCL and underwent Tommy John surgery in April 2019, causing him to miss the entire season. He did not play in 2020 due to the cancellation of the Minor League Baseball season because of the COVID-19 pandemic. Englert spent the 2021 season with the Down East Wood Ducks of the Low-A East, going 6–3 with a 4.25 ERA and 90 strikeouts over  innings. Englert split the 2022 season between the Hickory Crawdads of the High-A South Atlantic League and the Frisco RoughRiders of the Double-A Texas League, going a combined 8–6 with a 3.64 ERA and 136 strikeouts over  innings. On August 12, 2022, Englert threw 7 innings of a combined no-hitter for Hickory.

On December 7, 2022, Englert was selected by the Detroit Tigers in the 2022 Rule 5 draft.

Wilmer Flores

Wilmer De Jesus Flores (born February 20, 2001) is a Venezuelan professional baseball pitcher in the Detroit Tigers organization.

Flores played college baseball at Arizona Western College. He signed with the Detroit Tigers as an undrafted free agent in July 2020. Flores spent his first professional season in 2021 with the Florida Complex League Tigers and Lakeland Flying Tigers. After the season he played in the Arizona Fall League.

Flores started 2022 with the West Michigan Whitecaps.

His brother, also named Wilmer Flores, plays in Major League Baseball.

Luis García

Luis José García (born October 1, 2000) is a Dominican professional baseball infielder in the Detroit Tigers organization.

García signed with the Philadelphia Phillies as an international free agent in July 2017. The Phillies added him to their 40-man roster after the 2021 season.

On September 6, 2022, García was claimed off waivers by the Detroit Tigers.

Brant Hurter

Brant Harris Hurter (born September 6, 1998) is an American professional baseball pitcher in the Detroit Tigers organization.

Hurter attended Woodstock High School in Woodstock, Georgia, and played college baseball at Georgia Tech. In 2018, he played collegiate summer baseball with the Yarmouth–Dennis Red Sox of the Cape Cod Baseball League. He was drafted by the Detroit Tigers in the seventh round of the 2021 Major League Baseball Draft.

Hurter made his professional debut with the Lakeland Flying Tigers in 2022. He was later promoted to the West Michigan Whitecaps and Erie SeaWolves during the season.

Colt Keith

Colten Keith (born August 14, 2001) is an American professional baseball third baseman in the Detroit Tigers organization.

Keith grew up in Ohio before moving to Utah. He and his family then moved again to Buckeye, Arizona, where he attended Verrado High School before transferring to Biloxi High School in Biloxi, Mississippi, as a junior in 2019. He was named the Gatorade Baseball Player of the Year for the state of Mississippi as a junior after batting .527 with nine home runs and 49 RBIs. As a senior in 2020, he batted .269 with eight RBIs before the season was cancelled due to the COVID-19 pandemic. He was drafted by the Detroit Tigers in the fifth round of the 2020 Major League Baseball draft. He signed with the Tigers rather than play college baseball at Arizona State University.

Keith made his professional debut in 2021 with the Florida Complex League Tigers before being promoted to the Lakeland Flying Tigers and West Michigan Whitecaps. Over 65 games between the three teams, he slashed .286/.396/.789 with two home runs, 32 RBIs, eight doubles, and five triples. He opened the 2022 season with West Michigan.

Andre Lipcius

Andre Martinas Lipcius (born May 22, 1998) is an American professional baseball third baseman in the Detroit Tigers organization.

Lipcius would attend Lafayette High School in Williamsburg, Virginia, where he was a four-year letterman and a team captain. He would commit to the University of Tennessee, where he would play with his brother and fraternal twin, Luc, and major in nuclear engineering. and, as a freshman, was named to the SEC All-Freshman Team, as he started all 52 of the team's games at first base leading the team with 11 doubles. He would move to shortstop as a sophomore and improve on nearly all his batting metrics, including jumping from one to seven home runs, and improving his average from .275 to .315. In 2018, he played collegiate summer baseball with the Harwich Mariners of the Cape Cod Baseball League, and was named a league all-star. He would finish his career as a junior, starting all 61 games for the Volunteers at third base, and leading the team with 17 home runs to go with 58 RBIs, a .306 average, and a team-leading 72 hits.

Lipcius would be drafted in the third round, 83rd overall, in the 2019 MLB Draft by the Detroit Tigers. Lipcius was assigned to the Single-A West Michigan Whitecaps to start his career, and he had a strong first professional campaign. The rookie would hit .273 over 253 at bats, with an OBP of .344. The COVID-19 pandemic meant that Lipcius would not be able to play in the minor leagues of the MLB in 2020, however Lipcius would play with the Peninsula Pilots in the college summer league, the Coastal Plain League.

In 2021, Lipcius would start the season once again in West Michigan, albeit, now at the High-A level due to the shake-up in affiliates in the Detroit Tigers organization. On June 1, Lipcius would receive a call-up to the Double-A Erie SeaWolves. At the time of his call-up, Lipcius led the Whitecaps in batting average at .277, had three home runs and 13 RBIs, and had 12 walks to 16 strikeouts, helping him to an OBP of .357 and an OPS of .839.

Lipcius was optioned to the Triple-A Toledo Mud Hens to begin the 2023 season.

Justyn-Henry Malloy

Justyn-Henry Malloy (born February 19, 2000) is an American baseball third baseman in the Detroit Tigers organization.

Malloy grew up in Bergenfield, New Jersey, and attended Saint Joseph Regional High School. He committed to play college baseball at Vanderbilt after his freshman year, during which he batted .329 with five home runs and 31 RBIs. Malloy began his college baseball at Vanderbilt. He played mostly as a reserve for the Commodores over two seasons. After his sophomore season, Malloy transferred Georgia Tech. In his only season with the Yellow Jackets, he batted .308 with 11 home runs and 43 RBIs.

Malloy was selected in the sixth round of the 2021 Major League Baseball draft by the Atlanta Braves. After signing with the team for a bonus of $297,500, he was assigned to the Low-A Augusta GreenJackets. Malloy was assigned to the High-A Rome Braves at the beginning of the 2022 season. He slashed .304/.409/.479 with 10 home runs, 16 doubles, and 44 RBIs in 71 games with Rome before being promoted to the Double-A Mississippi Braves in July. Malloy appeared in 54 games with Mississippi, hit for a .268 batting average with 11 doubles, six home runs, 31 RBI, .403 OBP, and .824 OPS, and was promoted to the Gwinnett Braves in September. After the 2022 Minor League Baseball season ended, MILB.com considered Malloy an organizational All-Star. He was assigned to the Scottsdale Scorpions of the Arizona Fall League in the 2022 offseason. In the AFL, Malloy primarily played left field, a position he had started playing upon his promotion to Mississippi. 

On December 7, 2022, Malloy was traded to the Detroit Tigers along with LHP Jake Higginbotham for Joe Jimenez.

Vanderbilt Commodores bio
Georgia Tech Yellow Jackets bio

Parker Meadows

Parker Meadows (born November 2, 1999) is an American professional baseball outfielder in the Detroit Tigers organization.

Meadows attended Grayson High School in Loganville, Georgia, the same school as his brother, fellow professional baseball player Austin Meadows. Meadows would get drafted in the second round, 44th overall, by the Tigers in the 2018 MLB Draft. Meadows signed with the Tigers organization and received a $2.5 million signing bonus, nearly a full $1 million above the slot value for the 44th overall pick. Meadows began his professional career in rookie ball with where he hit .284 with an OBP of .376, to go with four home runs in just 22 games. He would get called up to the Connecticut Tigers to finish the rest of the 2018 campaign where he continued the strong start to his professional career, going six-for-19 (.316 average) in his six games at that level. In the lead-up to, and following, the 2019 season, he would be listed within the top twelve Tigers prospects in the organization by various outlets, including a rating as high as ninth.

In that 2019 season, Meadows spent the entire year with the Single-A West Michigan Whitecaps. Meadows saw a dip in productivity, falling to a .221 batting average and .296 OBP, however he also hit seven home runs and drove in 40 RBIs while stealing 14 bases. He also walked 47 times over the course of the season, though he struck out 113 times as well. Meadows was not selected to be part of the Tigers alternate training squad for the shortened 2020 MLB season, however, with the cancellation of the 2020 minor league season, Meadows would continue to work out at his parents' residence in Loganville and Grayson High School. On September 3, Meadows was among four Tigers minor league players called up for the Tigers' alternate training site in Toledo.

Meadows was optioned to the Triple-A Toledo Mud Hens to begin the 2023 season.

Reese Olson

Reese Olson (born July 31, 1999) is an American baseball pitcher in the Detroit Tigers organization.

Olson was born in Gainesville, Georgia, and attended North Hall High School. He was drafted by the Milwaukee Brewers in the 13th round of the 2018 MLB draft. In 2019, Olson started 14 games for High-A Wisconsin Timber Rattlers, posting a 4–7 record with a 4.66 ERA and 84 strikeouts over 94 innings. He did not play a minor league game in 2020 due to the cancellation of the minor league season caused by the COVID-19 pandemic. In 2021, Olson started 14 games for High-A Wisconsin Timber Rattlers, posting a 5–4 record with a 4.30 ERA and 79 strikeouts over 69 innings.

On July 31, 2021, Olson was traded to the Detroit Tigers in exchange for Daniel Norris. He was assigned to the West Michigan Whitecaps. He was ranked the organization's thirteenth best prospect in MLB.com's mid-season 2021 update.

He was named the 2022 MiLB Gold Glove as the best defensive pitcher in the minor leagues.

Olson was optioned to the Triple-A Toledo Mud Hens to begin the 2023 season.

Freddy Pacheco

Freddy Alexander Pacheco (born April 17, 1998) is a Venezuelan professional baseball pitcher for the Detroit Tigers of Major League Baseball (MLB).

Pacheco signed with the St. Louis Cardinals as an international free agent in November 2017. The Cardinals added him to their 40-man roster after the 2021 season.

Pacheco was optioned to the Triple-A Memphis Redbirds to begin the 2023 season.

On March 14, 2023, Pacheco was claimed off waivers by the Detroit Tigers.

Izaac Pacheco

Izaac Kane Pacheco (born November 18, 2002) is an American baseball shortstop in the Detroit Tigers organization.

Pacheco grew up in Friendswood, Texas, and attended Friendswood High School. He was named the 24-6A Newcomer of the Year after he hit .296 with 14 extra-base hits in his freshman season. Pacheco was named the District 22-5A Offensive Most Valuable Player as a sophomore after he hit for a .442 average with five home runs, 15 RBIs, 25 runs scored, and 16 stolen bases. As a senior, Pacheco as the District 22-5A MVP after batting .543 with six home runs, 12 doubles, 45 RBIs, and 41 runs scored.

Pacheco was selected 39th overall in the 2021 Major League Baseball draft by the Detroit Tigers. Pacheco signed with the team on July 23, 2021, and received a $2.75 million signing bonus. Pacheco was assigned to the Rookie-level Florida Complex League Tigers after signing, where he batted .226  with four doubles, three triples, one home run, and seven RBIs. He opened the 2022 season with the Lakeland Flying Tigers of the Single-A Florida State League. Pacheco batted .267 with 21 doubles and eight home runs in 88 games with the team before being promoted to the High-A West Michigan Whitecaps.

Bryant Packard

Bryant Thomas Packard (born October 6, 1997) is an American professional baseball outfielder in the Detroit Tigers organization.

Packard attended East Carolina University from 2017 to 2019. After featuring in a supporting role as a freshman, he had a breakout sophomore year batting .406 with a .462 OBP. He hit 14 home runs with 50 RBIs and was named to seven All-American teams, including five as a first-team selection. He was the AAC Conference Player of the Year and a unanimous selection to the All-AAC First Team. He was named on the preseason Golden Spikes Award watchlist entering his junior year. He would hit .358 as a junior with a .444 OBP, aided by walking nine times more as a junior than a sophomore. He would hit seven home runs, a career-high 19 doubles, and finished with 40 RBIs. In 2018, he played collegiate summer baseball with the Wareham Gatemen of the Cape Cod Baseball League, where he was named a league all-star.

Packard was taken in the fifth round of the 2019 MLB Draft. He would start his career in the Detroit Tigers system with A-Short Season Connecticut Tigers. Over 11 games, he would hit .351 with a .432 OBP, walking six times compared to just nine strikeouts. He would then join the Single-A West Michigan Whitecaps where he would continue his ascent. After hitting .309 with a .404 OBP, along with three home runs and 12 RBIs, in 23 games, he would end his 2019 season with the A-Advanced Lakeland Flying Tigers. Packard spent five games with Lakeland ending with a pair of hits and a pair of RBIs. Ahead of the 2020 season, which was set to be his first full professional campaign, he was named the Tigers' #17 prospect according to MLB.com He did not play a minor league game in 2020 due to the cancellation of the minor league season caused by the COVID-19 pandemic.

Wenceel Pérez

Wenceel Xavier Pérez (born October 30, 1999) is a Dominican professional baseball shortstop in the Detroit Tigers organization.

Pérez signed with the Tigers as an international free agent in July 2016, and would be assigned to the DSL Tigers as his first professional stop a year later in 2017. Over his first 61 games, he would hit .314 with a .387 OBP, while walking 27 times compared to 21 strikeouts. He would also steal sixteen bases and earn a call-up to the GCL Tigers in 2018. Pérez quickly earned a jump up to the short season single-A Connecticut Tigers after hitting .383 with a .462 OBP in his twenty games, and he would be called up to the West Michigan Whitecaps after just a month in Connecticut.

Pérez made an impact in his debut in West Michigan with a four-for-four night including two runs scored. He would hit .309 with West Michigan over sixteen games, and would begin his 2019 season with the Whitecaps. He was named to the Detroit Tigers' Top 30 Prospects List by MLB.com ahead of the 2019 season at #12. He spent the full 2019 season with West Michigan. Over 124 games, Pérez batted .233 with an OBP of .299. He hit three home runs, 16 doubles, six triples, and finished with 30 RBIs while stealing 21 bases. He did not play in a game in 2020 due to the cancellation of the minor league season because of the COVID-19 pandemic.

Pérez was optioned to the Triple-A Toledo Mud Hens to begin the 2023 season.

Dylan Smith

Dylan Miguel Smith (born May 28, 2000) is an American professional baseball pitcher in the Detroit Tigers organization.

Smith grew up in Stafford, Texas, and attended Stafford High School. He was selected in 18th round by the San Diego Padres in 2018 Major League Baseball draft, but opted not to sign with the team.

Smith played college baseball at Alabama for three seasons. He appeared in 13 games as a freshman and had an ERA of 6.48. Smith pitched  innings over four appearances with one start before the season ended prematurely due to the coronavirus pandemic. He became a starter prior to his junior season and went 2-8 with a 3.84 ERA with 113 strikeouts 20 walks in  innings pitched across 16 starts.

Smith was selected in the 3rd round of the 2021 MLB draft by the Detroit Tigers. Smith signed with the team on July 26, 2021, and received a $1,115,000 signing bonus.

 Alabama Crimson Tide bio

Brendan White

Brendan James White (born November 18, 1998) is an American professional baseball pitcher in the Detroit Tigers organization.

White played college baseball at Siena College. He was drafted by the Detroit Tigers in 26th round of the 2019 Major League Baseball draft.

The Tigers added White to their 40-man roster after the 2022 season. White was optioned to the Triple-A Toledo Mud Hens to begin the 2023 season.

Gage Workman 

Gage Tater Workman (born October 24, 1999) is an American professional baseball third baseman in the Detroit Tigers organization.

Workman attended Basha High School in Chandler, Arizona, where he played baseball. He was originally set to graduate in 2018, but reclassified to the class of 2017. In 2017, he batted .396. Following the season, he was selected by the Milwaukee Brewers in the 14th round of the 2017 Major League Baseball draft, but did not sign, and instead chose to honor his commitment to play college baseball at Arizona State University.

In 2018, Workman's freshman season, he appeared in fifty games (making 48 starts) in which he batted .276 with three home runs and 25 RBIs. That summer, he played in the Cape Cod Baseball League for the Brewster Whitecaps. As a sophomore in 2019, he slashed .330/.413/.528 with eight home runs, 42 RBIs, and nine stolen bases over 57 games. He earned honorable mention for both the All-Pac-12 team and the All-Pac-12 defensive team. He returned to play in the Cape Cod League for Brewster, and was named a league all-star. Over 17 games as a junior in 2020, he compiled three home runs and 14 RBIs before the college baseball season was cut short due to the COVID-19 pandemic.

Workman was selected by the Detroit Tigers in the fourth round as the 102nd overall pick in the 2020 Major League Baseball draft, and signed. He did not play a minor league game in 2020 due to the cancellation of the minor league season caused by the pandemic. To begin the 2021 season, he was assigned to the Lakeland Flying Tigers of the Low-A Southeast. After slashing .256/.357/.426 with three home runs, 19 RBIs, 16 doubles, and 22 stolen bases over 51 games, he was promoted to the West Michigan Whitecaps of the High-A Central in early July. Over 67 games with the Whitecaps, Workman batted .237/.302/.440 with nine home runs and 39 RBIs. He was assigned to the Erie SeaWolves of the Double-A Eastern League for the 2022 season. Over 128 games, he slashed .225/.276/.415 with 14 home runs, 68 RBIs, thirty stolen bases, and thirty doubles. He was selected to play in the Arizona Fall League for the Salt River Rafters after the season.

Workman's father, Widd, also played baseball at Arizona State and spent four seasons in the minor leagues with the San Diego Padres. Workman is a member of the Church of Jesus Christ of Latter-day Saints, and chose to skip his mission trip in order to continue playing college baseball without missing a season. He and his wife, Alexa, married in November 2020.

Arizona State Sun Devils bio

Full Triple-A to Rookie rosters

Triple-A

Double-A

High-A

Single-A

Rookie

Foreign Rookie

References 

D
Minor league players